NGC 2536 is a barred spiral galaxy with a prominent inner ring structure encircling the bar in the constellation Cancer that is interacting with NGC 2535.  The two galaxies are listed together in the Atlas of Peculiar Galaxies as an example of a spiral galaxy with a high surface brightness companion.

References

External links
 
 Spitzer Space Telescope page on NGC 2536

Barred spiral galaxies
Interacting galaxies
Peculiar galaxies
Cancer (constellation)
2536
04264
22958
082